Pan Am Flight 73 was a Pan American World Airways flight from Bombay, India, to New York, United States with scheduled stops in Karachi, Pakistan and Frankfurt, West Germany.

On September 5, 1986, the Boeing 747-121 serving the flight was hijacked while on the ground at Karachi by four armed Palestinian men of the Abu Nidal Organization. The aircraft, with 360 passengers on board, had just arrived from Bombay. A grand jury later concluded that the militants were planning to use the hijacked airliner to pick up Palestinian prisoners in both Cyprus and Israel.

More than twenty passengers were killed during the hijacking, including nationals from India, the United States, Pakistan, and Mexico. All the hijackers were arrested and sentenced to death in Pakistan. However, the sentences were later commuted to life in prison. Neerja Bhanot, head attendant on the flight, was shot dead and posthumously received the highest civil award Tamgha-e-Pakistan from Pakistan as well as India's highest peacetime award for bravery, the Ashok Chakra Award, for her efforts to save passengers' lives.

Hijacking at Karachi
Pan Am Flight 73 originated in Mumbai and stopped at the Karachi airport for a scheduled stopover at 4:30a.m. It was carrying 394 passengers and 9 infants, an American flight crew and 13 Indian flight attendants. A total of 109 passengers disembarked at Karachi. The first busload of fresh passengers from Karachi had barely reached the aircraft standing on the tarmac when the hijacking began to unfold.

Two hijackers dressed in the sky-blue uniforms of the Pakistan Airport Security Force drove up to the aircraft in a van fitted with a siren and flashing lights. They rushed up the ramp, firing shots into the air. Another two hijackers joined the first two men, one of them dressed in Pakistani shalwar kameez and carrying a briefcase full of grenades. There was also gunfire outside the aircraft reported around this time, which killed two Kuwait Airlines staff members working on an aircraft nearby. The hijackers fired shots at the feet of a flight attendant forcing him to close the door. Another flight attendant, Neerja Bhanot, was out of sight of the hijackers and relayed the hijack code to the cockpit crew, who subsequently exited the aircraft through the overhead emergency hatch, via the Inertial Reel Escape Device.
After about 40 minutes from the landing of Flight 73, the airliner came under the control of the hijackers. The exit of the pilots immobilised the aircraft.

The four hijackers were dressed as Karachi airport security guards and were armed with assault rifles, pistols, grenades, and plastic explosive belts. The hijackers drove a van that had been modified to look like an airport security vehicle through a security checkpoint up to one of the boarding stairways to Pan Am Flight 73.

The four hijackers were later identified as Zayd Hassan Abd al-Latif Safarini (Safarini, alias "Mustafa"), Jamal Saeed Abdul Rahim (alias "Fahad"), Muhammad Abdullah Khalil Hussain ar-Rahayyal ("Khalil"), and Muhammad Ahmed Al-Munawar (alias "Mansoor"). Pakistani authorities also identified another accomplice Wadoud Muhammad Hafiz al-Turki ("Hafiz") and arrested him a week later.

Demand for pilot 
Within a short time after seizing control of the aircraft, the lead hijacker Safarini realized that the cockpit crew had escaped and therefore he would be forced to negotiate with officials. First and business class passengers were ordered to go towards the back of the plane. At the same time, passengers at the back of the plane were ordered forward. Since the aircraft was nearly full, passengers sat down in the aisles, galleys and door exits. 

At approximately 10:00, Safarini went through the plane and arrived at the seat of Rajesh Kumar, a 29-year-old Kenya-born Indian resident of Huntington Beach California who had recently been naturalized as an American citizen. Safarini ordered Kumar to come to the front of the aircraft, to kneel at the front doorway of the aircraft, and to face the front of the aircraft with his hands behind his head. Safarini negotiated with officials, in particular Viraf Daroga, the head of Pan Am's Pakistan operation, stating that if the crew was not sent on the plane within 30 minutes, then Kumar would be shot. Shortly thereafter, Safarini became impatient with the officials and grabbed Kumar and shot him in the head in front of witnesses both on and off the aircraft. Safarini heaved Kumar out of the door onto the ramp below. Pakistani personnel on the ramp reported that Kumar was still breathing when he was placed in an ambulance, but he was pronounced dead on the way to the hospital in Karachi.

Safarini joined the hijackers and ordered flight attendants Bhanot, Sunshine Vesuwala, and Madhvi Bahuguna to begin collecting passports. They complied with this request. During the collection of the passports, believing passengers with American passports would be singled out by the hijackers, the flight attendants proceeded to hide some of the American passports under seats, and dumped the rest down a rubbish chute.

After the passports had been collected, Bhanot came onto the intercom and asked for Michael John Thexton, a British citizen who boarded the flight in Karachi and was returning home to England after spending a holiday in Pakistan, to come to the front of the plane. Thexton, who was due to disembark in Frankfurt to connect to another Pan Am flight to London, went through the curtain into the front of the plane where he came face to face with Safarini, who was holding Thexton's passport. He asked Thexton if he was a soldier and if he had a gun, Thexton replied "No". He ordered Thexton onto his knees. Safarini told the officials that if anyone came near the plane that he would go on to kill another passenger. Viraf Daroga told Safarini that there was a crew member on board who was able to use the cockpit radio and asked him to negotiate through radio. Safarini went back to Thexton and asked him whether he would like a drink of water, to which Thexton replied "Yes." Safarini also asked Thexton if he was married, and claimed he did not like all this violence and killing and said that the Americans and Israelis had taken over his country and left him unable to lead a proper life. One of the hijackers ordered Thexton back through the plane to a seat.

The hijack stalemate continued on into the night. During the stalemate, Dick Melhart was positioned by the door and was able to unlock it when the firing started. About 21:00 the auxiliary power unit shut down, all lighting turned off, and emergency lights came on. Passengers at the front were ordered toward the back, while passengers at the back were ordered forward. Since the aisles were already full of passengers, those passengers standing just sat down.

With the plane out of power and sitting in near darkness, a hijacker at the L1 door said a prayer and then aimed to shoot at the explosive belt worn by another hijacker near the door. The intent was to cause an explosion massive enough to kill all passengers and crew on board, as well as themselves. Since the cabin was dark, the hijacker missed, causing only a small detonation. Immediately the hijackers began shooting their weapons into the cabin at passengers and attempted to throw their grenades. Yet again the lack of light caused them to not pull pins fully and to create only small explosions. Ultimately it was the bullets that created the most damage since each bullet would bounce off aircraft cabin surfaces and create crippling shrapnel. An air hostess at the L3  door opened the door; although the slide did not deploy, several passengers and crew jumped down the fifteen feet or 6m/20 ft. to the ramp. Dick Melhart was able to unlatch the door at R3 which was the exit over the wing, passengers jumped out from this exit. A grounds staff trapped on board during the ordeal was responsible for opening the R4 door, which was the only door armed to deploy the emergency slide. Ultimately this slide allowed for more passengers to evacuate safely and without injuries. Bhanot and the other crew members bravely escorted as many passengers as they could first and then evacuated themselves afterwards.

Assault

The Pakistani unit responsible for taking the plane was the Special Services Group (SSG) which was led by Brig. Tariq Mahmud. The group closed in on the aircraft after the power unit went out but didn't begin storming the plane until they heard shots fired from within the plane. By the time the commandos reached the plane, many passengers had already begun escaping.

There are some inconsistencies regarding the Pakistani Army's reported response to the generator dying. This confusion was later attributed to a rush by officials to take credit for a successful assault on the hijackers followed by a walking-back of statements once the death toll of the tragedy became clear.

Passengers
The 365 total passengers plus crew on Pan Am 73 were citizens of 14 different countries. Citizens of India represented roughly 27% of the people on board the flight, and 24% of those killed. Citizens of three India, Italy, and the United together represented the bulk (71%) of those killed.

Nationalities

Cockpit crew
 Captain William Allen "Bill" Kianka (born June 1, 1934), Age 52, He served in the U.S. Navy from 1952 to 1954 and fought in one tour in the Korean War, and was serving with Pan Am as a Captain since 1954.
 First Officer Conway Tehan Dodge Sr. (born May 30, 1933), Age 53, He served in the U.S. Marine Corps from 1951 to 1955 and fought in two tours in the Korean War, and was serving with Pan Am as a First Officer since 1955.
 Flight Engineer John Joseph Ridgway (born September 25, 1940), Age 45, He was serving with Pan Am as a Flight Engineer since 1962.

Aftermath

Trial and sentencing
On July 6, 1988, the five Palestinian men were convicted in Pakistan for their roles in the hijacking and murders and sentenced to death: Zayd Hassan Abd al-Latif Safarini, Wadoud Muhammad Hafiz al-Turki, Jamal Saeed Abdul Rahim, Muhammad Abdullah Khalil Hussain ar-Rahayyal, and Muhammad Ahmed al-Munawar. The sentences were later commuted to life in prison.

According to a CNN report, Safarini was handed over to the FBI from a prison in Pakistan in September 2001. He was taken to the United States where on May 13, 2005 he was sentenced to a 160-year prison term. At the plea proceeding, Safarini admitted that he and his fellow hijackers committed the offences as members of the Abu Nidal Organization, also called the ANO, a designated terrorist organization.

The other four prisoners were deported by Pakistani authorities to Palestine in 2008.

Libyan involvement and legal action
Libya has been accused of sponsoring the hijacking, as well as carrying out the bombings of Pan Am Flight 103 in 1988 and UTA Flight 772 in 1989.

In August 2003, Libya accepted responsibility for "the actions of its officials" for the bombing of Pan Am Flight 103, but was silent on the question of the Pan Am Flight 73 hijacking. Libya offered US$2.7 billion in compensation to the families of the 270 victims of Pan Am Flight 103 and, in January 2004, agreed to pay $170 million to the families of the 170 victims of UTA Flight 772. The seven American UTA victims' families refused the offer and instead filed a claim for $2.2 billion against Libya. From 2004 to 2006 the US and the UK jointly opened up relations with Libya, leading to the removal of sanctions imposed and of Libya's inclusion on the list of countries that sponsor terrorism.

In June 2004, a volunteer group of families and victims from the incident, Families from Pan Am Flight 73, was formed to work toward a memorial for those killed in the incident, to seek the truth behind this terrorist attack, and to hold those responsible for it accountable. On April 5, 2006, the law firm of Crowell & Moring LLP, representing the surviving passengers, estates and family members of the hijacking victims, announced it was filing a civil suit in U.S. District Court for the District of Columbia seeking $10 billion in compensatory damages, plus unspecified punitive damages, from Libya, Muammar al-Gaddafi and the five convicted hijackers. The lawsuit alleged Libya provided the Abu Nidal Organization with material support and also ordered the attack as part of a Libyan-sponsored terrorist campaign against American, European and Israeli interests.

British media that was critical of normalisation of relations between Gaddafi and the West reported in March 2004 (days after Prime Minister Tony Blair visited Tripoli) that Libya was behind the hijacking.

As of September 2015 about $700 million of funds that Libya gave the US to settle claims related to Libyan sponsored terrorism has not been distributed to families of victims who were Indian passport holders.

Reward and reported killing of accused
Zayd Hassan Abd al-Latif Safarini was extradited to the U.S. by the Government of Pakistan. He is serving his 160-year sentence at the Federal Correctional Complex in Terre Haute, Indiana.

The other four prisoners were deported by Pakistani authorities to Palestine in 2008. On December 3, 2009, the FBI, in coordination with the State Department, announced a $5M reward for information that leads to the capture of each of the four remaining hijackers of Pan Am 73.

One of the four, Jamal Saeed Abdul Rahim, was allegedly killed in a drone strike in Pakistan on 9 January 2010. His death was never confirmed and he remains on the FBI's Most Wanted Terrorists list and the State Department's Rewards for Justice list.

In hopes of generating new leads for the alleged hijackers the FBI released new age-progressed images on January 11, 2018. The case is still under investigation by the Washington Field Office of the Bureau.

Aircraft
The aircraft was a four-engined Boeing 747-121 delivered to Pan Am on 18 June 1971, with registration  and named Clipper Live Yankee by the airline. It was later renamed and at the time of the incident was named Clipper Empress of the Seas. After the incident the aircraft was renamed Clipper New Horizons. Pan Am sold the aircraft to Evergreen International in 1988 and then leased it back. The aircraft was returned by Pan Am to Evergreen in April 1991. Evergreen scrapped the aircraft the next month.

In popular culture
The film Neerja was released in 2016 depicting the hijacking and the actions of all the flight attendants on the aircraft. Neerja Bhanot was the Senior Flight Purser and the youngest recipient of the highest Indian bravery award, Ashoka Chakra. She also received the United States Special Courage award and the Pakistani Tamgha-e-Insaaniyat.

See also

 1986 Bombing of Libya
 List of Pan American World Airways accidents and incidents

Notes

References

Bibliography

Further reading
 Stettler, Jeremaiah. "25 years later, experiencing Pan Am hijacking still haunts Utahn." The Salt Lake Tribune. August 7, 2014.
 "New Security Measures for Pan Am Airlines ." ABC News. December 6, 1986. Getty Images Clip #450000364

External links
 
Hijacking of Pan AM Flight 73: Significant Events, The United States Attorney's Office, US Department of Justice, 25 February 2016.
 U.S. Department of Justice Attorney's Office For the District of Columbia Information on court proceedings of Pan Am Flight 73
 "UNITED STATES ARRESTS KNOWN HIGHJACKER FROM PAN AMERICAN WORLD AIRWAYS FLIGHT 73". U.S. Department of Justice. Monday October 1, 2001.
 U.S. Department of Justice May 13, 2004, press release on the Pan Am Flight 73 criminal case
 Crowell & Moring Pan Am Flight 73 civil suit against Libya, Gaddafi and the five hijackers
 Naqvi, Jawed. "This Karachi nightmare and that." Dawn. July 1, 2014.
 For the book by Mike Thexton about his experience on Pan Am Flight 73, 'What happened to the Hippy Man?', see the book's web page
 Photos of the airliner at airliners.net
 "Karachi hijack ends in bloodshed." bbc.co.uk.
 Pan Am Flight 73 September 1986 Karachi ABC News Nightline, September 6, 1986. YouTube video. uploaded December 26, 2017.
Macneil, Robert, & Lehrer, Lim. "Flight 073: What Happened? What Next?" The MacNeil/Lehrer NewsHour. September 5, 1986
Inside a hijack: The unheard stories of the Pan Am 73 crew
Jet Survivors Say Army Didn't Help

1986 in Pakistan
1986 in India
September 1986 events in Asia
20th century in Karachi
Aviation accidents and incidents in 1986
Mass murder in 1986
Terrorist incidents in Pakistan in 1986
Accidents and incidents involving the Boeing 747
Aircraft hijackings
Aircraft hijackings in Pakistan
73
Indian people murdered abroad
Operations involving Pakistani special forces
Abu Nidal attacks
Terrorist incidents in Karachi
Military government of Pakistan (1977–1988)
Jinnah International Airport
India–Pakistan relations
Pakistan–United States relations
India–Libya relations
Libya–Pakistan relations
Libya–United States relations